Alberta is a Canadian province.

Alberta may also refer to:

Places

Australia 

 Alberta, Queensland, a locality in the Central Highlands, Australia

Canada 

 Alberta (Provisional District), a federal electoral district in the Northwest Territories from 1887 to 1908
 District of Alberta, a former district of the North West Territories, now the southern part of the province of Alberta
 Mount Alberta, Alberta

United States 
 Alberta, Alabama, an unincorporated community
 Alberta, former name of Rockwood, California, an unincorporated community
 Alberta, Louisiana, a former lumbering community just north of Roy, Louisiana
 Alberta, Michigan, an unincorporated community
 Alberta, Minnesota, a city
 Alberta, Virginia, a town
 Alberta City, Tuscaloosa, Alabama, a suburb of Tuscaloosa
 Alberta Township, Benton County, Minnesota

People 
 Alberta (given name)
 Alberta (singer), singer from Sierra Leone

Music 
 "Alberta" (blues), several blues songs
 "Alberta" (song), the official provincial song of Alberta
 T-Rex Alberta, a guitar effect pedal

Other uses 
 Alberta (plant), a genus in the family Rubiaceae
 45562 Alberta, a British LMS Jubilee Class locomotive
 Project Alberta, part of the Manhattan Project
 University of Alberta, Edmonton, Alberta, Canada

See also 
 
 Albertan epoch, alternate name for the Middle Cambrian geological epoch
 Albertosaurus dinosaur